Bigloo is a programming language, a dialect of the language Lisp, an implementation of the language Scheme. It is developed at the French IT research institute French Institute for Research in Computer Science and Automation (INRIA). It is oriented toward providing tools for effective and diverse code generation that can match the performance of hand-written C or C++. The Bigloo system contains a Scheme compiler that can generate C code and Java virtual machine (JVM) or .NET Framework (.NET) bytecode. As with other Lisp dialects, it contains an interpreter, also termed a read-eval-print loop (REPL). It is free and open-source software. The run-time system and libraries are released under a GNU Lesser General Public License (LGPL). The compiler and programming tools are released under a GNU General Public License (GPL).

"Bigloo is a Scheme implementation devoted to one goal: enabling Scheme based programming style where C(++) is usually required."

The Hop web application engine and Roadsend PHP are written in Bigloo.

Libraries 
 Biglook – a cross-platform graphical user interface (GUI) module that interfaces with GTK+ and Java Swing

Bigloo-lib 
The Bigloo-lib project contains modules for:

 Regular Expressions
 MzScheme Compatibility
 iconv Character Set Conversion
 Extended Console Application support – This includes support for GNU Readline, and termios
 SQL – tested with MySQL, Oracle, PostgreSQL, and SQLite
 XML – an interface to the Expat XML parser
 GTK

See also
List of JVM languages

References

External links
 

Scheme (programming language) compilers
Scheme (programming language) interpreters
Scheme (programming language) implementations